Claes Andreas Holmberg (born 17 August 1984) is a Swedish football manager who manages Degerfors.

Career

Playing career

Holmberg started his career with Swedish third tier side Qviding, helping them earn promotion to the Swedish second tier. In 2007, he signed for Degerfors in the Swedish second tier.

Managerial career

In 2020, Holmberg was appointed manager of Swedish second tier club Degerfors, helping them earn promotion to the Swedish top flight.

References

External links

 

1984 births
Allsvenskan managers
Association football defenders
Degerfors IF managers
Degerfors IF players
Division 2 (Swedish football) players
Ettan Fotboll players
Living people
Qviding FIF players
Swedish footballers
Superettan managers
Superettan players